Wesele (The Wedding) is a motion picture made in 1972 in Poland by Andrzej Wajda as an adaptation of a play by the same title written by Stanisław Wyspiański in 1901. Wajda also directed "Wesele" for the theatre.

"Wesele" is a defining work of Polish drama written at the turn of the 20th century. It describes the perils of the national drive toward self-determination after the Polish uprisings of November 1830 and January 1863, the result of the Partitions of Poland. It also refers to the Galician slaughter of 1846. The plot is set at the wedding of a member of Kraków intelligentsia (the Bridegroom, played by Daniel Olbrychski), and his peasant Bride (played by Ewa Ziętek). Their class-blurring union follows a fashionable trend among friends of the playwright from the modernist Young Poland movement.

The play by Wyspiański was based on a real-life event: the wedding of Lucjan Rydel at the St. Mary's Basilica in Kraków and his wedding reception in the village of Bronowice. It was inspired in part also by the modernist painting of Jacek Malczewski and Maksymilian Gierymski.

Plot

A poet marries a peasant girl in Kraków. Their wedding reception follows. The celebration of the new marriage moves on from the city to the villager's house. In the rooms adjoining that of the wedding party, guests continually burst into arguments, make love, or simply rest from their merriment, dancing and feasting. Interspersed with the real guests are the well-known figures of Polish history and culture, who represent the guilty consciences of the characters. The two groups gradually begin a series of dialogues. The Poet (played by Andrzej Łapicki) is visited successively by the Black Knight, a symbol of the nation's past military glory; the Journalist (played by Wojciech Pszoniak), then by the court jester and conservative political sage Stańczyk; and the Ghost of Wernyhora (Marek Walczewski), a paradigm of leadership for Poland. Wernyhora presents the Host with a golden horn symbolizing the national mission, and calls the Polish people to a revolt. One of the farm hands is dispatched to sound the horn at each corner of Poland, but he loses the horn soon after.

Cast 

 Daniel Olbrychski, groom (Lucjan Rydel)
 Ewa Ziętek, bride 
 Andrzej Łapicki, poet (Kazimierz Przerwa-Tetmajer) 
 Wojciech Pszoniak - journalist (Rudolf Starzewski) and jester Stańczyk
 Franciszek Pieczka – Czepiec, gmina scribe (real person: Błażej Czepiec)
 Marek Walczewski, host (Włodzimierz Tetmajer) 
 Izabella Olszewska, hostess 
 Maja Komorowska – Rachel
 Marek Perepeczko – Jasiek
 Gabriela Kownacka – Zosia
 Olgierd Łukaszewicz - ghost (Ludwik de Laveaux (painter))
 Bożena Dykiel – Kasia
 Janusz Bukowski – Kasper
 Artur Młodnicki – ghost of Wernyhora
 Wirgiliusz Gryń - vampire in the image of Jakub Szela 
 Leszek Piskorz – Staszek
 Czesław Wołłejko – Hetman  (Franciszek Ksawery Branicki)
 Mieczysław Voit – Jew, father of Rachel
 Hanna Skarżanka – Klimina
 Małgorzata Lorentowicz – Councilwoman
 Andrzej Szczepkowski – Nos ("nose", journalist )
 Emilia Krakowska – Marysia
 Mieczysław Stoor – Wojtek
 Barbara Wrzesińska – Maryna
 Henryk Borowski – Grandfather
 Kazimierz Opaliński - Father
 Maria Konwicka – Haneczka
 Anna Góralska – Isia
 Mieczysław Czechowicz - Priest
 Wiktor Grotowicz – Ghost accompanying Hetman
 Czesław Niemen – Chochoł (fictional character) (literally straw wrap) (voice)

and

 „Kamionka” (folk band from Łysa Góra)
 „Koronka” (folk band from Bobowa)
 „Opocznianka” (folk band Opoczno)

Awards
 Silver Seashell Award at the San Sebastián International Film Festival.

See also
 Culture of Kraków
 Juliusz Słowacki Theatre
 Polish Film School

References

External links
 

Polish drama films
1972 films
Polish films based on plays
1970s Polish-language films
Films directed by Andrzej Wajda